The 39th Academy Awards, honoring the best in film for 1966, were held on April 10, 1967, hosted by Bob Hope at the Santa Monica Civic Auditorium in Santa Monica, California.

In a rare occurrence during the period with five Best Picture nominees, only two were nominated for Best Director this year: Fred Zinnemann for A Man for All Seasons (the winner) and Mike Nichols for Who's Afraid of Virginia Woolf?. The latter was the second film in Oscars history to be nominated in every eligible category (after Cimarron (1931)), as well as the first of three to date to receive acting nominations for the entire credited cast.

For the second time in Oscars history, two siblings were nominated in the same category: Vanessa and Lynn Redgrave, both nominated for Best Actress for their performances in Morgan! and Georgy Girl, respectively. This had previously occurred in 1941, when sisters Joan Fontaine and Olivia de Havilland were each nominated for Best Actress.

Six films won multiple Oscars this year—A Man for All Seasons, Who's Afraid of Virginia Woolf?, Grand Prix, Fantastic Voyage, A Man and a Woman, and Born Free—a record that was later tied in 2010, 2012, and 2017, and surpassed in 2020/21, when seven films won at least two Oscars. Every Best Picture nominee was nominated for Best Actor as well, the only time in the era of five Best Picture nominees that each nominated film received a nomination in a single acting category.

Winners and nominees

Nominees were announced on February 20, 1967. Winners are listed first, highlighted in boldface and indicated with a double dagger.

Honorary Awards
 Yakima Canutt "for achievements as a stunt man and for developing safety devices to protect stunt men everywhere."	
 Y. Frank Freeman "for unusual and outstanding service to the Academy during his thirty years in Hollywood."

Irving G. Thalberg Memorial Award
 Robert Wise

Jean Hersholt Humanitarian Award
 George Bagnall

Multiple nominations and awards

These films had multiple nominations:
 13 nominations: Who's Afraid of Virginia Woolf?
 8 nominations: A Man for All Seasons and The Sand Pebbles
 7 nominations: Hawaii
 5 nominations: Alfie and Fantastic Voyage
 4 nominations: The Fortune Cookie, Georgy Girl, A Man and a Woman and The Russians Are Coming, the Russians Are Coming
 3 nominations: Gambit, The Gospel According to St. Matthew, Grand Prix and The Professionals
 2 nominations: Blowup, Born Free, Is Paris Burning?, Juliet of the Spirits, Mister Buddwing, Morgan! and The Oscar

The following films received multiple awards:
 6 wins: A Man for All Seasons
 5 wins: Who's Afraid of Virginia Woolf?
 3 wins: Grand Prix
 2 wins: Born Free, Fantastic Voyage and A Man and a Woman

Trivia
 The Academy Awards broadcast was almost canceled due to a strike involving the American Federation of Television and Radio Artists (AFTRA), the theatrical performers union governing live telecasts. The dispute was settled only three hours before the ceremony was scheduled to begin; Bob Hope's opening monologue makes many references to this, including a claim that as late as 30 minutes before the ceremony began, it was uncertain whether the telecast would go on. 
 This was the only time in the history of the Academy Awards that all Best Actress nominees were born outside of the United States.
 Patricia Neal, making her first Hollywood appearance since a near-fatal stroke of two years before, received a standing ovation from the audience.
 California's governor, Ronald Reagan, was among the guests in the audience. He was a longtime Academy member and supporter.
 This was the last year that separate awards were given for black-and-white and color films in Cinematography, Art Direction-Set Decoration, and Costume Design.
 Mitzi Gaynor's performance of the song "Georgy Girl" is often cited as being one of the most heralded performances on an Oscar broadcast.

Presenters and performers
The following individuals, listed in order of appearance, presented awards or performed musical numbers.

Presenters

Performers

See also 
 24th Golden Globe Awards
 1966 in film
 9th Grammy Awards
 18th Primetime Emmy Awards
 19th Primetime Emmy Awards
 20th British Academy Film Awards
 21st Tony Awards
 List of submissions to the 39th Academy Awards for Best Foreign Language Film

References

External links
 The 39th Annual Academy Awards at IMDb
 List of winners at Infoplease

Academy Awards ceremonies
1966 film awards
1966 awards in the United States
1967 in California
1967 in American cinema
April 1967 events in the United States
Events in Santa Monica, California
20th century in Santa Monica, California